Dimitri Vasilievich Nalivkin (1889–1982) was a geologist from the Soviet Union.  He was primarily interested in stratigraphy, but was also responsible in large part for mapping the geology of the USSR.

The son of a mining engineer, Nalivkin was born in St. Petersburg in 1889, and followed his father's footsteps by entering the local Mining Academy in 1907.  During his training he began teaching there, and also became involved in fieldwork expeditions in the Caucasus and Central Asia.  Early work dealt with Devonian brachiopods in the Kyrgyzstan portion of the Fergana Valley, and he retained an interest in this geological period throughout his career.

Career 
He received the A. P. Karpinsky Distinguished Award in 1913 for one of his papers on faunal composition, and this provided him with the means to go to the Russian Biological Station in Villefranche (France) to study mollusks. By 1915 Nalivkin was considered an expert in central Asian geology. He was asked by the Russian Geographical Society to lead an expedition to study ancient glaciations in the Pamir. Their results of their study confirmed traces of two ancient glaciations, as well as producing a stratigraphic succession and the completion of a tectonic map. Nalivkin was awarded the Small Silver Medal of the Geographical Society in recognition of his leadership of the expedition. He was called to military service in 1917, and following demobilisation in late 1917, returned to his studies of Devonian fauna.

In 1917 he was elected to the Geological Commission of Russia, and remained with it for more sixty years.  During his tenure with the Commission he was responsible for directing research into palaeontology, sedimentology and stratigraphy, work which led to the development and extraction of resources such as coal, ores and petroleum.

He completed his doctorate in 1924 and was appointed a Professor at the Saint Petersburg Mining University.  During World War II, his research extended to a search for bauxite as a means of assisting the war effort's need for aircraft metals.

His most significant contribution came with the creation of the index geological maps of the USSR (and adjacent regions), which attracted considerable international attention.  With the completion of his Geological Map of the USSR (1:2,500,000 scale) he was awarded the prestigious Lenin Prize in 1957.

Memberships and awards 
 Director of the Institute of Geological Mapping
 Vice-director of the Geological Institute of the Academy of Science
 Chairman of the Technical Council under the USSR Ministry of Geology
 Director of the Limnology Laboratory
 Chairman of the Commission on International Tectonic Mapping
 President of the Presidium of the Turkmenian Branch of the USSR Academy of Sciences
 Member of the Science Board of the Russian Museum.
 Leader, Soviet Delegation at Session XXII of the International Geological Congress, as well as delegations at other international conferences and meetings. 
 N. M. Przhevalsky Small Silver Medal of the Russian Geographical Society
 Karpinsky Gold Medal of the USSR Academy of Sciences
 F. Posepny Gold Medal of the Czechoslovakian Academy of Sciences
 P. Fourmarier Medal of the Belgium Academy of Sciences
 L. von Buch Medal of the German Geological Society
 Silver Medal of the Peace Council
 Honorary Fellow of the German Geographical Society
 Fellow, Turkmen Academy of Sciences
 Fellow, CSSR Academy of Sciences
 Fellow, Serbia Academy of Sciences and Fine Arts
 Fellow, the Paleontological Society of India
 Fellow of the Geological Society of America
 Fellow, Geological Societies of London, France, West Germany, Hungary, and Poland

Personal life 
Nalivkin married fellow geologist A.K. Zvorykina. He died in St Petersburg in 1982.

References

1889 births
1982 deaths
Soviet geophysicists
Soviet paleogeographers
Soviet geologists
Heroes of Socialist Labour
Scientists from Saint Petersburg